EPTV may refer to:

European Parliament TV (EuroparlTV), a European online platform for webcasting
Établissement public de télévision, Algerian national television company
Télévision Algérienne, its eponymous television network
Emissoras Pioneiras de Televisão, a Brazilian television broadcaster